The 2011 Bank of Beijing China Open was a professional ranking snooker tournament that took place between 28 March and 3 April 2011 at the Beijing University Students' Gymnasium in Beijing, China.

Mark Williams was the defending champion, but he lost 4–5 against Stephen Lee in the first round, despite making four century breaks.

Judd Trump won his first ranking title by defeating Mark Selby 10–8 in the final. Trump made his 100th career century during the final.

Prize fund
The breakdown of prize money for this year is shown below: 

Winner: £60,000
Runner-up: £30,000
Semi-final: £15,000
Quarter-final: £8,000
Last 16: £5,925
Last 32: £4,000
Last 48: £2,200
Last 64: £1,500 

Stage one highest break: £400
Stage two highest break: £2,000
Total: £325,000

Wildcard round
These matches were played in Beijing on 28 & 29 March.

Main draw

Final

Qualifying
These matches took place between 24 and 27 February 2011 at the World Snooker Academy, Sheffield, England.

Century breaks

Qualifying stage centuries

 140, 117, 115, 103  Kurt Maflin
 138  Jimmy Robertson
 137  Tony Drago
 136  Stuart Pettman
 134  Mark King
 130  Ben Woollaston
 120  Dominic Dale
 120  Martin Gould

 116, 106  Jack Lisowski
 112, 101  David Gilbert
 109  Judd Trump
 107  Jamie Burnett
 107  Robert Milkins
 105  Matthew Couch
 105  Ken Doherty
 102  Anthony Hamilton

Televised stage centuries

 142, 114  Robert Milkins
 139, 134, 132, 131, 130, 129, 124, 102  Mark Selby
 138  Nigel Bond
 137, 113, 104, 100  Mark Williams
 137  Mark Davis
 134, 133, 126, 120, 117  Ding Junhui
 133, 117  Li Hang
 130, 113, 104, 104  Judd Trump
 128  Barry Hawkins
 124  Neil Robertson

 123  Ronnie O'Sullivan
 117  Yu Delu
 108  Shaun Murphy
 107  John Higgins
 106  Joe Perry
 103  Kurt Maflin
 101  Tian Pengfei
 100  Stephen Hendry
 100  Ryan Day

References

China Open (snooker)
China Open
Open (snooker)
Sports competitions in Beijing